Copthorne is a hamlet in the parish of North Petherwin, Cornwall, England.

References

Hamlets in Cornwall